Francis Winter Boggs (March 1870 – October 27, 1911) was an American stage actor and pioneer silent film director. He was one of the first to direct a film in Hollywood.

Biography
He was born in Santa Rosa, California to George W. Boggs and Alabama McMeans.  While in his teens he began acting with the Alcazar stock company in San Francisco and toured the American southwest. In 1900, he moved to Los Angeles, but in 1902, he went to Chicago, where he continued to work in theatre. There, he met William Nicholas Selig and in 1907 became involved with the making of motion pictures at Selig's Polyscope studios in Chicago. With cameraman and jack of all trades Thomas Persons, Boggs made one of his earliest films, Monte Cristo. He completed the interior shots at the Chicago studio, but shot the scenes of Edmond Dantès emerging from the sea at the beach near Los Angeles. 

In Chicago in 1908, he made The Fairylogue and Radio-Plays, which had its writer, L. Frank Baum, present a slide show and films as a live travelogue presentation of his Oz story. In March 1909, he returned to the west coast, where he filmed In the Sultan’s Power, one of the first motion pictures completely made in Los Angeles. He left Los Angeles in April to go on location in Yosemite and Oakland in California and the Hood River Valley in Oregon. In October, Boggs returned to Los Angeles and rented a small bungalow in the Edendale district as a permanent base from which he operated a west coast satellite studio for Selig. Other East Coast studios soon began filming on the west coast to take advantage of its moderate climate. Among people Boggs started in the film industry were actor-director Hobart Bosworth, actor-director Robert Z. Leonard, cowboy star Art Acord, and actresses Betty Harte, Bessie Eyton, and Bebe Daniels. (The Sergeant, a Western short in Yosemite produced and directed by Boggs and written and starring Bosworth, was released in September 1910.) He also gave Roscoe "Fatty" Arbuckle his first movie work, 1909's Ben's Kid, and made four short films with him. 

Boggs was shot to death by Frank Minnimatsu on October 27, 1911, when Minnimatsu, a caretaker and janitor, who had been fired before the shooting for smoking cigarettes in the garage and while drunk firing shots into a gasoline tank in the garage, became violently deranged. Studio owner Selig tried to wrestle the gun away from the man and he too was shot, wounded in the arm. Ironically, that same day in 1911, David Horsley and Al Christie set up their Nestor Studios in Hollywood, sounding the death knell for Edendale as the film production center of Los Angeles. Within two years, more than a dozen film companies would follow Boggs' example and establish facilities in and around Los Angeles.

Boggs was buried at Graceland Cemetery in Chicago.

His film The Sergeant was part of a group of seventy-five early American films found in New Zealand in 2010; the film was preserved by the Academy Film Archive in 2012.

References

External links

 

1870 births
1911 deaths
American male screenwriters
19th-century American male actors
American male stage actors
20th-century American male actors
Burials at Graceland Cemetery (Chicago)
Deaths by firearm in California
Male actors from Santa Rosa, California
People murdered in California
Silent film directors
Film directors from California
Film producers from California
Screenwriters from California
20th-century American male writers
20th-century American screenwriters
19th-century American businesspeople